Kalevi Hämäläinen (13 December 1932  – 10 January 2005) was a Finnish cross-country skier who competed in the late 1950s and early 1960s. He won the 50 km event at the 1960 Winter Olympics in Squaw Valley. He was born in Juva.

Hämäläinen also won three medals in the FIS Nordic World Ski Championships with a gold in the 30 km (1958), and bronzes in the 4 × 10 km relay (1958) and the 50 km (1962).

Cross-country skiing results
All results are sourced from the International Ski Federation (FIS).

Olympic Games
 1 medal – (1 gold)

World Championships
 3 medals – (1 gold, 2 bronze)

References

External links

1932 births
2005 deaths
People from Juva
Cross-country skiers at the 1956 Winter Olympics
Cross-country skiers at the 1960 Winter Olympics
Cross-country skiers at the 1964 Winter Olympics
Finnish male cross-country skiers
Olympic medalists in cross-country skiing
FIS Nordic World Ski Championships medalists in cross-country skiing
Medalists at the 1960 Winter Olympics
Olympic gold medalists for Finland
Sportspeople from South Savo
20th-century Finnish people